"Aishite mo Aishitarinai" is Fayray's 17th single. It was released on May 26, 2004, and peaked at #46. It was used as insert song for the
Kansai TV/Fuji TV series drama "At Home Dad" and "At Home Dad Special". The coupling is a cover of "My Funny Valentine".

Track listing
愛しても愛し足りない (Aishite mo Aishitarinai; No matter how much I love you, it's never enough)
My Funny Valentine
愛しても愛し足りない Guitar Version

Charts 
"Aishite mo Aishitarinai" - Oricon Sales Chart (Japan)

External links
FAYRAY OFFICIAL SITE

2004 singles
Fayray songs
2004 songs
Songs written by Fayray